Vattisen Yaly (Tradition of the Old) is a contemporary revival of the ethnic religion of the Chuvash people, a Turkic ethnicity of Bulgar ancestry mostly settled in the republic of Chuvashia and surrounding federal subjects of Russia.

Vattisen Yaly could be categorised as a particular form of Tengrism, a related revivalist movement of Central Asian traditional religion. However, Vattisen Yaly differs significantly from other forms of Tengrism in that the Chuvash have been heavily influenced by Finnic and Slavic cultures as well as those of other Indo-European speaking ethnicities (they were also never fully Islamised, unlike most other Turkic peoples). Their religion shows many similarities with Finnic and Slavic Paganisms; moreover, the revival of "Vattisen Yaly" in recent decades has occurred following Neopagan patterns. Today the followers of the Chuvash Traditional Religion are called "the true Chuvash". Their main god is Tura, a deity comparable to the Estonian Taara, the Germanic Thunraz and the pan-Turkic Tengri.

The Chuvash traditional religion boasts an unbroken continuity from pre-Christian times, having been preserved in a few villages of the Chuvash diaspora outside Chuvashia until modern times. In the late 1980s and early 1990s, together with the demise of the Soviet Union, a cultural and national revival blossomed among the Chuvash, and its leaders gradually embraced the idea of a return to indigenous Paganism, as did Chuvash intellectuals. The Chuvash identity movement looked to movements in the Baltic states for inspiration.

The national movement, meanwhile embodied in a Chuvash National Congress, carried on its "national religion" idea during the 1990s. Intellectuals started to recover and codify ancient rituals and started practicing them among the population both in cities and countryside villages, declaring themselves the guardians of tradition and the descendants of elder priests.

Groups 
In the mid-1990s, the proponents of the movement felt that to fulfill the role of a "national religion" and stand against world religions and cultural assimilation, Vattisen Yaly should be reconstructed and reformulated in institutional forms. A variety of groups emerged dedicated to the goal of reviving the Chuvash religion. A lot of publications on the religion appeared, and artists and sculptors joined academic scholars in the creation of models for the construction of ritual-ceremonial complexes. In Chuvash culture ,  is an epithet of the Sun.

Arguments emerged among the groups and factions over matters such as theology and national organisation of the religions. For instance, Iosif Dimitriev (Trer), an artist and enthusiastic follower of the religion and member of the "Chuvash National Religion" group, supports a tritheistic view centered on the god Tura, a mother goddess Ama, and a begotten god who is Tura reborn, and an organisation similar to that of the Catholic Church.

The  are also sacred trees and traditional worship sites spread on Chuvash lands.

Another phenomenon is the spontaneous revival of traditional village festivals. On these occasions, reconstructed prayers and blessings are performed along with ritual sacrifices. Such rituals are connected to community and family life, often involving rites of passage such as weddings, births, and anniversaries.

See also 
 Chuvash National Congress

References

Bibliography 
 
 
 Valentin Stetsyuk. Introduction to the Study of Prehistoric Ethnogenic Processes in Eastern Europe and Asia, The Turkic Tribe Bulgar in Eastern Europe. Lviv, Ukraine.
 
 Marc Ira Hooks. The Chuvash People - An Ethnographic Study & Missiological Strategy Analysis. Engage Russia.

Weblinks 
 Чӑваш тӗнне ӗненекенсем валли ҫӗр ыйтнӑ
 Чӑвашсем Сурхурие пуҫтарӑннӑ
 Шура Шурумбус: Чувашские Боги Асы (Астурри)

Eurasian shamanism
Modern pagan traditions
Modern paganism in Russia
Religion in Chuvashia
Tengriism
Turkic mythology
Chuvash people